The Nicolet Southwest River (in French: rivière Nicolet Sud-Ouest) is a tributary on the west bank of the Nicolet River. It empties into the municipality of Nicolet, in the Nicolet-Yamaska Regional County Municipality (MRC), in the administrative region of Centre-du-Québec, in Quebec, in Canada.

This river flows through the regional county municipalities (MRC):

Administrative region of Estrie:
 MRC of Le Haut-Saint-François Regional County Municipality: Dudswell;
 MRC des Les Sources Regional County Municipality: Danville;

Administrative region of Centre-du-Québec:
 MRC of Arthabaska Regional County Municipality: Saint-Félix-de-Kingsey, Quebec, Saint-Samuel;
 MRC of Drummond Regional County Municipality: Saint-Lucien, Notre-Dame-du-Bon-Conseil (parish), Notre-Dame-du-Bon-Conseil (village), Sainte-Brigitte-des-Saults;
 MRC of Nicolet-Yamaska Regional County Municipality: Sainte-Eulalie, Saint-Léonard-d'Aston, Grand-Saint-Esprit, La Visitation-de-Yamaska, Nicolet.

Geography 

The main neighboring hydrographic slopes of the Nicolet Sud-Ouest river are:
 North side: Nicolet River, Lake Saint-Pierre, St. Lawrence River;
 East side: Marguerite River, Nicolet River, Bécancour River;
 South side: Saint-Zéphirin River, rivière des Saults, Landry River, Danville River, Stoke River;
 West side: Saint-François River.

The "Nicolet Sud-Ouest River" has its source at "Lac chez Piet" located between two mountains in the territory of the municipality of Dudswell.

Upper course of the river (segment of )

From "Lac chez Piet", the "Nicolet Sud-Ouest" river flows over:
  northward to the limit of the municipality of Saint-Adolphe-de-Dudswell, that is also the limit of the Le Haut-Saint-François Regional County Municipality;
  northwesterly in the municipality of Wotton, to route 216;
  northwesterly through Wotton, to the eastern shore of "Les Trois Lacs";
  to the west, crossing Les Trois-Lacs (Les Sources), this body of water overlaps the Les Sources Regional County Municipality (Wotton) and that of Arthabaska Regional County Municipality (municipalities of Trois-Lacs and Saint-Rémi-de-Tingwick);
  southwesterly, up to the limit of the municipality of Danville (Shipton sector);
  west, forming a large loop north bypassing the village of Danville, to the confluence of the Landry River;
  north-west, in the municipality of Danville (Shipton sector) to the bridge (route 255) southwest of the village of Saint-Félix-de-Kingsey.

Intermediate course of the river (segment of )

From the village of Kingsey Falls, the Nicolet Sud-Ouest river flows over:
  towards the north-west, cutting on  the southern corner of the territory of Sainte-Élisabeth-de-Warwick, and crossing on  the territory of Sainte-Séraphine, up to the limit of the municipalities of Kingsey Falls and Saint-Lucien;
  westward through Saint-Lucien, to the Domaine Parent bridge;
  north-west, to the bridge located southwest of the village of Sainte-Clothilde-de-Horton; its course is then only  (on the southwest side) of the course of the Nicolet River;
  westward in Sainte-Clothilde-de-Horton, to the limit of the MRC of Drummond Regional County Municipality;
  north-west in Notre-Dame-du-Bon-Conseil (village), to the village bridge;
  north-west to autoroute 20;

Lower course of the river (segment of )

From highway 20, the river flows over:
  north-west, to the village bridge of Sainte-Brigitte-des-Saults;
  northwesterly, to the limit of La Visitation-de-Yamaska;
  northwesterly, to the confluence of the Sévère-René River;
  northwesterly, to the confluence of the Saint-Zéphirin River;
  north, up to its confluence.

The main tributaries of the Nicolet Sud-Ouest river are:
 Saint-Zéphirin River
 Sévère-René River
 Rivière des Saults
 Landry River
 Carmel River
 Lafont River
 Rivière à Pat
 Nicolet Centre River
 Nicolet North-East River
 Dion River
 Saint-Camille Brook

Toponymy 

The toponym "Rivière Nicolet Sud-Ouest" was formalized on December 5, 1968, at the Commission de toponymie du Québec.

See also 
 List of rivers of Quebec

References 

Rivers of Centre-du-Québec
Nicolet-Yamaska Regional County Municipality
Drummond Regional County Municipality
Les Sources Regional County Municipality
Arthabaska Regional County Municipality
Le Haut-Saint-François Regional County Municipality